Chris Rumph II (born October 19, 1998) is an American football outside linebacker for the Los Angeles Chargers of the National Football League (NFL). He played college football at Duke and was drafted by the Chargers in the fourth round of the 2021 NFL Draft.

Early life and high school
Rumph moved often during his early life due his father's career as a football coach. He moved to Gainesville, Florida and transferred to Buchholz High School before his sophomore year. As a senior, he was named first-team All-State and the Big School Player of the Year by The Gainesville Sun after recording 105 tackles, 23 tackles for loss, 18 sacks, two blocked punts, one interception and two fumble recoveries. Rumph committed to play college football at Duke over offers from UCF, Vanderbilt, and Appalachian State.

College career
Rumph redshirted his true freshman season. As a redshirt freshman, he recorded 25 tackles, 8.0 tackles for loss, 3.0 sacks, one fumble recovery, and one pass broken up and was named a freshman All-American by USA Today. Rumph posted 47 tackles, 13.5 tackles for loss, 6.5 sacks, three pass breakups, 11 quarterback hurries and one forced fumble and was named third-team All-Atlantic Coast Conference (ACC) and First-team All-America by Pro Football Focus and Second-team All-America by Sports Illustrated.

Professional career

Rumph was drafted by the Los Angeles Chargers in the fourth round, 118th overall, of the 2021 NFL Draft. On May 18, 2021, Rumph signed his four-year rookie contract with the Chargers.

Personal life
Rumph's father, Chris Rumph, played linebacker at South Carolina and has coached at the collegiate and professional levels and is currently the defensive line coach for the Minnesota Vikings.

References

External links
Duke Blue Devils bio

1998 births
Living people
Players of American football from Gainesville, Florida
American football linebackers
Duke Blue Devils football players
African-American players of American football
Los Angeles Chargers players
21st-century African-American sportspeople